Abdulrasheed Umaru Ibrahim (born 12 August 1999), is a Qatari professional footballer who plays as a forward for Qatar Stars League side Al Ahli. 
Renowned for specific ability of shooting, marksmanship and physical strength, and hailed as a super-sub, Abdulrasheed Umaru is widely regarded to be one of the most promising talents of the Qatari football.

Career statistics

Club

Notes

Honours
Individual
 AFC U-19 Championship Top Goalscorer: 2018 (7 goals)

References

External links

1999 births
Living people
Qatari footballers
Qatari expatriate footballers
Association football forwards
Aspire Academy (Qatar) players
K.A.S. Eupen players
Al Ahli SC (Doha) players
Qatar Stars League players
Expatriate footballers in Belgium
Qatari expatriate sportspeople in Belgium
Qatar under-20 international footballers
Qatar youth international footballers
Qatari people of Nigerian descent